Kosin may refer to the following places:
Kosin, Łódź Voivodeship (central Poland)
Kosin, Lublin Voivodeship (east Poland)
Kosin, Lubusz Voivodeship (west Poland)
Kosin, Drawsko County in West Pomeranian Voivodeship (north-west Poland)
Kosin, Pyrzyce County in West Pomeranian Voivodeship (north-west Poland)
 Kosin or Kosinë, Ferizaj village in Ferizaj municipality, Kosovo